Podocarpus acuminatus is a species of conifer in the family Podocarpaceae. It is found in Brazil and Venezuela.

References

acuminatus
Near threatened plants
Taxonomy articles created by Polbot
Flora of Brazil
Flora of Venezuela
Taxa named by David John de Laubenfels